Australia's Open Garden Scheme was a non-profit organisation that began in Victoria Australia in 1987 but closed its doors in June 2015 due to financial issues. Its aim was to promote the knowledge and pleasure of gardens and gardening across Australia. Under the scheme, private gardens opened for public viewing for one or two weekends a year. About 650 gardens were opened annually across Australia but declining numbers and competition from groups promoting their own events outside of their booklet meant that it was not viable. Each year over 275,000 adults visited open gardens, together with accompanying children. A schedule for openings across Australia was published annually.

Tamie Fraser was President of the Open Garden Scheme. Neil Robertson was the CEO and Australian Broadcasting Corporation senior executive Thomas Murrell was a director and West Australian chairman for 9 years from 1997 - 2006.  His own garden, Chartwell House in Subiaco, Perth was open to the public on 18 October 1998.  Murrell was also responsible for expanding the scheme into regional areas in Western Australia and started gardening at the age of 5. 
 
The scheme grew out of the practice in Victoria of "grand" private gardens in the hill country near Melbourne opening occasionally for public viewing for the benefit of charities. However the scheme did not limit itself to large gardens, with many normal-sized suburban gardens, and even tiny inner-city plots, included. Most openings in the southern, temperate zone occurred between October and May, while tropical gardens open during the winter months.

A nominal fee was charged for each viewing. This money was divided with 35% going to the garden owner or their nominated charity, and 65% going to the Open Garden Scheme. After funding the scheme operating costs, the remainder was given as grants to community garden projects, with over $800,000 in grants being made by the end of 2006. Additionally garden owners passed on over $3.5 million to their nominated charities since the commencement of the scheme.

In 2015 new non-for-profit organisations have sprung up to carry on some of the tradition in individual states including Open Gardens SA and Open Gardens Victoria.  Both schemes aim to educate and promote the enjoyment, knowledge and benefits of gardens and gardening and are promoting a long list of garden openings from spring through to autumn each year.  They have attracted good membership numbers and visitor numbers.
Unfortunately, no Open Gardens Group has formed in Sydney, but an Open Gardens group exists in the Southern Highlands of NSW, and the famous gardens of Mount Wilson are generally available for viewing all year round; Spring and Autumn are the most popular seasons. 

 An independent business "My Open Garden" also promotes open gardens and gardening events across Australia. 
 A detailed list of 650 or more Open Gardens in Australia is still being constructed. Open Gardens claimed almost 20,000 gardens were opened because of the Scheme's development.

 Guide books and web guides to Open Gardens are also published in the UK, and were published in Australia by the ABC. All such lists have now migrated to the web, and are published regularly by Weekend Notes.

See also
Heritage Gardens in Australia

References

External links
Blue Mountains and Mount Wilson open gardens

Gardening in Australia
Non-profit organisations based in Victoria (Australia)